Nosy Tsarabanjina is a small island off the northwest coast of Madagascar in the Mitsio archipelago, situated near Nosy Be and Nosy Mitsio.

It received a small amount of fame in 1994 when BBC Reality TV programme Girl Friday featured Joanna Lumley spending 10 days on the island and living firstly on an A Frame bed, and then in "the Albert Hall cave". Since the BBC programme, the Island has been taken over by a hotel.

References
 Girl Friday at the Internet Movie Database
 Marriott, Edward, "What a Difference a Hotel Makes", Evening Standard, 25 May 2001
 Official website

Further reading
Lumley, Joanna (1994) Girl Friday. London: BBC Books ISBN 0-563-37071-8

Islands of Madagascar